René Hubert may refer to:
 René Hubert (historian)
 René Hubert (costume designer)